The Kungur constituency (No.60) is a Russian legislative constituency in Perm Krai. The constituency previously covered the entirety of southern Perm Oblast but in 2015 it gained parts of Perm and was reconfigured to southeastern Perm Krai.

Members elected

Election results

1993

|-
! colspan=2 style="background-color:#E9E9E9;text-align:left;vertical-align:top;" |Candidate
! style="background-color:#E9E9E9;text-align:left;vertical-align:top;" |Party
! style="background-color:#E9E9E9;text-align:right;" |Votes
! style="background-color:#E9E9E9;text-align:right;" |%
|-
|style="background-color:#EA3C38"|
|align=left|Mikhail Putilov
|align=left|Civic Union
|
|30.59%
|-
|style="background-color:"|
|align=left|Yury Babikov
|align=left|Independent
| -
|18.70%
|-
| colspan="5" style="background-color:#E9E9E9;"|
|- style="font-weight:bold"
| colspan="3" style="text-align:left;" | Total
| 
| 100%
|-
| colspan="5" style="background-color:#E9E9E9;"|
|- style="font-weight:bold"
| colspan="4" |Source:
|
|}

1995

|-
! colspan=2 style="background-color:#E9E9E9;text-align:left;vertical-align:top;" |Candidate
! style="background-color:#E9E9E9;text-align:left;vertical-align:top;" |Party
! style="background-color:#E9E9E9;text-align:right;" |Votes
! style="background-color:#E9E9E9;text-align:right;" |%
|-
|style="background-color:"|
|align=left|Vladimir Shestakov
|align=left|Independent
|
|44.98%
|-
|style="background-color:"|
|align=left|Aleksandr Dranitsyn
|align=left|Independent
|
|26.63%
|-
|style="background-color:"|
|align=left|Andrey Sobko
|align=left|Liberal Democratic Party
|
|5.13%
|-
|style="background-color:"|
|align=left|Anatoly Lamanov
|align=left|Independent
|
|4.82%
|-
|style="background-color:"|
|align=left|Aleksey Filimonov
|align=left|Independent
|
|4.19%
|-
|style="background-color:#019CDC"|
|align=left|Yury Kutaliya
|align=left|Party of Russian Unity and Accord
|
|2.26%
|-
|style="background-color:#000000"|
|colspan=2 |against all
|
|9.69%
|-
| colspan="5" style="background-color:#E9E9E9;"|
|- style="font-weight:bold"
| colspan="3" style="text-align:left;" | Total
| 
| 100%
|-
| colspan="5" style="background-color:#E9E9E9;"|
|- style="font-weight:bold"
| colspan="4" |Source:
|
|}

1999

|-
! colspan=2 style="background-color:#E9E9E9;text-align:left;vertical-align:top;" |Candidate
! style="background-color:#E9E9E9;text-align:left;vertical-align:top;" |Party
! style="background-color:#E9E9E9;text-align:right;" |Votes
! style="background-color:#E9E9E9;text-align:right;" |%
|-
|style="background-color:#3B9EDF"|
|align=left|Sergey Chikulayev
|align=left|Fatherland – All Russia
|
|30.85%
|-
|style="background-color:"|
|align=left|Sergey Shakhray
|align=left|Independent
|
|22.40%
|-
|style="background-color:"|
|align=left|Grigory Laptev
|align=left|Independent
|
|22.27%
|-
|style="background-color:"|
|align=left|Sergey Krutov
|align=left|Yabloko
|
|4.55%
|-
|style="background-color:"|
|align=left|Pyotr Yevdokimov
|align=left|Independent
|
|4.12%
|-
|style="background-color:"|
|align=left|Vladimir Ivanin
|align=left|Independent
|
|2.74%
|-
|style="background-color:"|
|align=left|Rastam Valeyev
|align=left|Independent
|
|1.76%
|-
|style="background-color:"|
|align=left|Nikolay Ignatyev
|align=left|Independent
|
|1.55%
|-
|style="background-color:#084284"|
|align=left|Vitaly Vilensky
|align=left|Spiritual Heritage
|
|0.27%
|-
|style="background-color:#000000"|
|colspan=2 |against all
|
|7.61%
|-
| colspan="5" style="background-color:#E9E9E9;"|
|- style="font-weight:bold"
| colspan="3" style="text-align:left;" | Total
| 
| 100%
|-
| colspan="5" style="background-color:#E9E9E9;"|
|- style="font-weight:bold"
| colspan="4" |Source:
|
|}

2003

|-
! colspan=2 style="background-color:#E9E9E9;text-align:left;vertical-align:top;" |Candidate
! style="background-color:#E9E9E9;text-align:left;vertical-align:top;" |Party
! style="background-color:#E9E9E9;text-align:right;" |Votes
! style="background-color:#E9E9E9;text-align:right;" |%
|-
|style="background-color:"|
|align=left|Yury Medvedev
|align=left|United Russia
|
|41.77%
|-
|style="background-color:"|
|align=left|Vladimir Shestakov
|align=left|Independent
|
|31.40%
|-
|style="background-color:"|
|align=left|Anatoly Lykov
|align=left|Communist Party
|
|5.30%
|-
|style="background-color:"|
|align=left|Viktor Volkov
|align=left|Agrarian Party
|
|3.86%
|-
|style="background-color:"|
|align=left|Aleksandr Zhuravlev
|align=left|Liberal Democratic Party
|
|2.62%
|-
|style="background-color:#C21022"|
|align=left|Vladimir Savchenkov
|align=left|Russian Pensioners' Party-Party of Social Justice
|
|1.82%
|-
|style="background-color:"|
|align=left|Yury Solodovnikov
|align=left|Independent
|
|0.44%
|-
|style="background-color:#000000"|
|colspan=2 |against all
|
|10.97%
|-
| colspan="5" style="background-color:#E9E9E9;"|
|- style="font-weight:bold"
| colspan="3" style="text-align:left;" | Total
| 
| 100%
|-
| colspan="5" style="background-color:#E9E9E9;"|
|- style="font-weight:bold"
| colspan="4" |Source:
|
|}

2016

|-
! colspan=2 style="background-color:#E9E9E9;text-align:left;vertical-align:top;" |Candidate
! style="background-color:#E9E9E9;text-align:left;vertical-align:top;" |Party
! style="background-color:#E9E9E9;text-align:right;" |Votes
! style="background-color:#E9E9E9;text-align:right;" |%
|-
|style="background-color: " |
|align=left|Dmitry Skrivanov
|align=left|United Russia
|
|43.32%
|-
|style="background-color:"|
|align=left|Aleksey Zolotarev
|align=left|Liberal Democratic Party
|
|12.57%
|-
|style="background-color:"|
|align=left|Vladimir Grebenyuk
|align=left|Communist Party
|
|11.68%
|-
|style="background-color:"|
|align=left|Sergey Zlobin
|align=left|A Just Russia
|
|9.25%
|-
|style="background-color: " |
|align=left|Nadezhda Agisheva
|align=left|Yabloko
|
|6.37%
|-
|style="background:"| 
|align=left|Aleksandr Sozinov
|align=left|Communists of Russia
|
|4.04%
|-
|style="background-color: "|
|align=left|Anton Lyubich
|align=left|Party of Growth
|
|1.87%
|-
|style="background-color: "|
|align=left|Yevgeny Zubov
|align=left|Rodina
|
|1.68%
|-
|style="background:"| 
|align=left|Aleksandr Mishchenkov
|align=left|People's Freedom Party
|
|1.51%
|-
| colspan="5" style="background-color:#E9E9E9;"|
|- style="font-weight:bold"
| colspan="3" style="text-align:left;" | Total
| 
| 100%
|-
| colspan="5" style="background-color:#E9E9E9;"|
|- style="font-weight:bold"
| colspan="4" |Source:
|
|}

2021

|-
! colspan=2 style="background-color:#E9E9E9;text-align:left;vertical-align:top;" |Candidate
! style="background-color:#E9E9E9;text-align:left;vertical-align:top;" |Party
! style="background-color:#E9E9E9;text-align:right;" |Votes
! style="background-color:#E9E9E9;text-align:right;" |%
|-
|style="background-color: " |
|align=left|Dmitry Skrivanov (incumbent)
|align=left|United Russia
|
|30.15%
|-
|style="background-color:"|
|align=left|Aleksey Kostitsyn
|align=left|Communist Party
|
|16.76%
|-
|style="background-color:"|
|align=left|Veronika Kulikova
|align=left|A Just Russia — For Truth
|
|14.93%
|-
|style="background-color: " |
|align=left|Sergey Isayev
|align=left|New People
|
|9.84%
|-
|style="background-color:"|
|align=left|Yekaterina Balykina
|align=left|Liberal Democratic Party
|
|6.98%
|-
|style="background-color: "|
|align=left|Olga Vshivkova
|align=left|Yabloko
|
|5.63%
|-
|style="background-color: "|
|align=left|Lyudmila Balakhonskaya
|align=left|Party of Pensioners
|
|4.62%
|-
|style="background:"| 
|align=left|Yana Kunavina
|align=left|Communists of Russia
|
|3.70%
|-
| colspan="5" style="background-color:#E9E9E9;"|
|- style="font-weight:bold"
| colspan="3" style="text-align:left;" | Total
| 
| 100%
|-
| colspan="5" style="background-color:#E9E9E9;"|
|- style="font-weight:bold"
| colspan="4" |Source:
|
|}

Notes

References

Russian legislative constituencies
Politics of Perm Krai